Population of British Columbia 5.368 million (2022)

Percentage of National Population: 13.2% (unchanged)

Population Growth Rate: 5.6%

Vital statistics

2020

Birth rate: 8.3 births per 1,000 (2021) (Canadian average = 9.9) 

Death rate: 8.3 deaths per 1,000 (2021)  (Canadian average = 8.3)

Infant mortality rate: 4.0 deaths per 1,000 live births

Life expectancy at birth: 82.4 years

Total fertility rate: 1.17 children born per woman (Canadian average = 1.40)

Age structure

Source: BCStats

Population history

Ethnic Origins
First-generation immigrants from the British Isles remain a strong component of local society despite limitations on immigration from Britain since the ending of special status for British subjects in the 1960s.  Also present in large numbers relative to other cities in Canada (except Toronto), and also present in BC ever since the province was first settled (unlike Toronto), are many European ethnicities of the first and second generation, notably Germans, Ukrainians, Scandinavians, Yugoslavs and Italians; third-generation Europeans are generally of mixed lineage, and traditionally intermarried with other ethnic groups more than in any other Canadian province.

In recent decades, the proportion of those of Chinese and Indian ethnicity has risen sharply, though still outnumbered by the historically strong population of those of German ancestry.  Visible minorities have become an important factor in ethnic-based politics, though most visible minorities are less numerous than the long-standing non-British European ethnicities making up BC's "invisible minorities".

Note:  The following statistics represent both single (e.g., "German") and multiple (e.g., "part Chinese, part English") responses to the 2006 and 2016 Census, and thus add up to more than 100%.

Projections

Indo-Canadians

Visible minorities and Indigenous Peoples
Note: Statistics Canada defines visible minorities as defined in the Employment Equity Act which defines visible minorities as "persons, other than Aboriginal peoples, who are non-Caucasian in race or non-white in colour".

Languages

Knowledge of languages

The question on knowledge of languages allows for multiple responses. The following figures are from the 2021 Canadian Census and the 2016 Canadian Census, and lists languages that were selected by at least one per cent of respondents.

Mother tongue
Figures shown are for the number of single language responses and the percentage of total single-language responses. Numerous other languages were also counted, but only languages with more than 2,000 native speakers are shown.

Religion

The largest denominations by number of adherents according to the 2021 census were Irreligion (atheist, agnostic, and so on.) with 2,559,250 (52.2%); Christianity with 1,684,870 (34.4%); Sikhism with 290,870 (5.9%); Islam with 125,915 (2.6%); Buddhism with 83,860 (1.7%); and Hinduism with 81,320 (1.7%).

Migration

Immigration 

The 2021 census reported that immigrants (individuals born outside Canada) comprise 1,425,715 persons or 29.0 percent of the total population of British Columbia.

Recent immigration 
A large number of immigrants have lived in British Columbia for 30 years or less.

The 2021 Canadian census counted a total of 197,420 people who immigrated to British Columbia between 2016 and 2021.

Interprovincial migration 

 British Columbia has also traditionally been gaining from interprovincial migration. Over the last 50 years, British Columbia had 12 years of negative interprovincial immigration: the lowest in the country. The only time the province significantly lost population to this phenomenon was during the 1990s, when it had a negative interprovincial migration for 5 consecutive years.

Source: Statistics Canada

See also

Demographics of Canada
Population of Canada by province and territory
Demographics of Vancouver
Demographics of Abbotsford, British Columbia

Notes

References

British Columbia
British Columbia society